Juntan Reservoir(), also known as Jiuxian Lake, is a vast reservoir in Guangfeng District of Shangrao, Jiangxi, China. It is one of the largest man-made lakes in Shangrao city.

Function
The reservoir provides drinking water, hydroelectric power and water for irrigation and recreational activities.

Dam

References

Shangrao
Reservoirs in Jiangxi